The twenty-seventh season of The Bachelor premiered on January 23, 2023. This season features 26-year-old Zach Shallcross, an Oracle sales executive from Anaheim Hills, California.

Shallcross finished in third place while exclusively pursuing Rachel Recchia on the nineteenth season of The Bachelorette featuring Recchia and Gabby Windey.

Production

Casting and contestants 
On September 14, 2022, it was reported that Shallcross was the frontrunner for the role. He was officially announced on September 20, 2022, during the live The Bachelorette season 19 finale. Shallcross then met his first 5 contestants - Bailey, Brianna, Brooklyn, Cat, and Christina.

Notable contestants include Christina Mandrell, who is the niece of country music singer Barbara Mandrell; Miss South Carolina 2018 Davia Bunch; Miss Florida World 2019 Lekha Ravi; and Ariel Frenkel, who is the ex-girlfriend of actor Michael Vlamis.

Filming and development 
The season is delayed by three weeks from its standard first week of January start, to avoid a potential clash with ABC's coverage of Monday Night Football.

Filming began on September 26, 2022, in Los Angeles. On October 22, the show was seen filming in Tallinn, Estonia. This season also includes visits to The Bahamas; London, England; and Budapest, Hungary, with filming concluding in Krabi, Thailand in mid-November.

Contestants  

32 potential contestants were revealed on September 23, 2022. 

The final cast of 30 women was announced on January 4, 2023.

In week 2, season 23 contestant Tahzjuan Hawkins asked to join the cast, but Shallcross declined.

Future appearances

The Bachelorette

Charity Lawson was chosen as the lead for season 20 of The Bachelorette.

Call-out order 

 The contestant received America's first impression rose
 The contestant received Zach's first impression rose
 The contestant was eliminated
 The contestant was eliminated outside the rose ceremony
 The contestant received a rose during a date
 The contestant received a rose outside of a rose ceremony or date
 The contestant was eliminated during a date
 The contestant moved on to the next week by default
 The contestant quit the competition
 The contestant won the competition

Controversy 
Contestant Greer Blitzer faced controversy shortly after the season premiere after tweets of her defending blackface were uncovered, continuing the trend of contestants with racist social media histories being cast in the franchise. On January 24, 2023, Blitzer issued an apology for her past behavior. 

The incident was further addressed during the Women Tell All special on March 14, 2023, with host Jesse Palmer acknowledging the franchise's failings to adequately address serious topics such as racism in the past. Blitzer also confirmed that she was educating herself on the history of blackface and had met with Dr. Kira Banks, a psychologist and diversity consultant.

Episodes

Notes

References

External links 

 

27
2023 American television seasons
Television shows filmed in California
Television shows filmed in the Bahamas
Television shows filmed in England
Television shows filmed in Estonia
Television shows filmed in Hungary
Television shows filmed in Thailand